The British Academy consists of world-leading scholars and researchers in the humanities and social sciences. Each year, it elects fellows to its membership. The following were elected in the 1950s.

1950 
 Professor A. F. Blunt
 Sir Cyril Burt
 C. T. Clay
 Professor W. J. Entwistle
 Professor W. K. Hancock
 W. C. Kneale
 Dr K. T. Parker
 Dr H. N. Randle

1951 
 Professor P. Alexander
 Professor T. S. Ashton
 Professor C. R. Cheney
 Dr J. G. D. Clark
 Professor A. R. Johnson
 Professor J. E. Meade
 J. B. Ward Perkins
 Professor A. R. Radcliffe-Brown
 Rev. Professor N. Sykes
 Professor J. Wilde

1952 
 Professor R. G. D. Allen
 Professor A. J. Ayer
 Professor A. M. Blackman
 Sir Cecil Carr
 Dr D. A. E. Garrod
 Dr A. L. Goodhart
 G. T. Griffith
 W. K. C. Guthrie
 Sir James Mann
 A. P. Oppé
 Professor J. Orr
 Professor D. L. Page
 Dr A. L. Poole
 H. G. Richardson
 Dr E. M. W. Tillyard
 Professor J. M. C. Toynbee
 Professor K. C. Wheare

1953 
 Professor J. Cerny
 Professor E. J. Dent
 Professor M. Ginsberg
 Professor R. H. Lightfoot
 Professor W. L. Lorimer
 Professor S. Piggott
 Lady Stenton
 Professor J. R. Sutherland
 Professor F. W. Walbank
 Dr E. J. Wellesz

1954 
 D. J. Allan
 Professor R. R. Darlington
 H. J. Davis
 C. H. S. Fifoot
 Professor H. Frankfort
 Professor W. B. Henning
 Professor M. E. L. Mallowan
 Professor A. D. Momigliano
 Dr S. Morison
 Professor L. J. Russell
 P. Sraffa
 J. N. Summerson
 L. S. Sutherland
 Rev. Dr V. Taylor
 Professor J. A. Westrup

1955 
 Professor R. I. Aaron
 Very Rev. Matthew Black
 Professor D. W. Brogan
 Professor Andrew Browning
 Dr Florence E. Harmer
 Sir Ivor Jennings
 Dr Kathleen M. Kenyon
 Professor H. D. F. Kitto
 Professor C. S. Lewis
 Seton H. F. Lloyd
 John W. Pope-Hennessy
 Professor E. A. G. Robinson
 Dr H. H. Scullard
 Dr Friedrich Waismann
 Professor E. K. Waterhouse

1956 
 H. S. Bennett
 E. H. Carr
 N. K. Chadwick
 Professor E. E. Evans-Pritchard
 Professor J. N. Findlay
 Professor F. H. Lawson
 Dr O. E. Pacht
 C. A. R. Radford
 A. N. Sherwin-White
 Professor W. Simon
 Professor J. R. N. Stone
 A. J. P. Taylor
 Professor E. G. Turner
 Dr R. R. Walzer
 Dr Dorothy Whitelock
 Dr G. Zuntz

1957 
 Professor A. Andrewes
 Sir Isaiah Berlin
 Professor C. R. Boxer
 Professor R. B. Braithwaite
A. M. Dale
 Professor D. Daube
 Professor A. Ewert
 Professor K. H. Jackson
 Dr L. Minio-Paluello
 Dr K. P. Oakley
 Hon. Sir Steven Runciman
 Professor R. S. Sayers
G. F. Webb
 Dr G. L. Williams

1958 
 Professor J. L. Austin
 Dr D. R. S. Bailey
 Helen Gardner
P. Grierson
N. R. Ker
 Dr L. S. B. Leakey
 Professor K. R. Popper
 J. V. Robinson
 Dr A. L. Rowse
 Professor I. Schapera
 Professor T. B. Smith
 Professor E. C. S. Wade
 Dr J. Walker
 Professor R. P. Winnington-Ingram
 Professor R. Wittkower

1959 
 Dr H. Buchthal
 Professor Bruce Dickins
 Dr A. B. Emden
 Professor W. B. Emery
 Dr O. R. Gurney
 G. S. Kirk
 Dr Thomas Parry
 Professor M. M. Postan
 Rev. Professor H. F. D. Sparks
 J. E. S. Thompson

See also 
 Fellows of the British Academy

References 
"Deaths and elections of fellows." Proceedings of the British Academy, annual reports 1950–1959. British Academy.